Jan Jonker Afrikaner is a senior secondary school in Windhoek, the capital of Namibia. It is situated in the Katutura suburb, and is named for Jan Jonker Afrikaner, Captain of the Orlam Afrikaners in South West Africa.

Jan Jonker Afrikaner High School was established in 1981 and  accommodates more than 800 learners. The school's colors are green and white. There are many extramural activities at the school, for instance sports and singing.

See also
 Education in Namibia
 List of schools in Namibia

References

Schools in Windhoek
Educational institutions established in 1981
1981 establishments in South West Africa